Splash Lagoon Indoor Waterpark Resort is a large Polynesian-themed indoor water park located in Erie, Pennsylvania. It features nine water slides, two hot tubs, one large activity pool, a five-story activity tree house play structure, a toddler play pool, a  wave pool, a FlowRider, and a  arcade. The resort is connected to a Holiday Inn Express, Hawthorn Suites (formerly Residence Inn), and a Comfort Inn, along with Hooch and Blotto's restaurant.

History 
Though originally planned to open in December 2002, the $17 million water park opened on February 28, 2003. Scott Enterprises, a local franchising company, built Splash Lagoon. Three of the park's water slides swerve in and out of the building, giving it a distinct look. The entire resort is adorned with tropical décor such as tiki statues, large murals, faux tiki torches, artificial palm trees, and sculptures made by local artists.

In 2004, Splash Lagoon prepared to expand the water park with two new slides: Python Plunge, a tube slide, and a body slide called Shark Attack. The slides opened in 2005 along with a new family-sized whirlpool named the Frog Pond and a new dining location, Boston's Restaurant and Sports Bar.

In 2008, Water Parks Resorts Today named Splash Lagoon as sixth largest water park hotel n North America.

On February 25, 2008, it was announced that Splash Lagoon would be adding a wave pool by spring 2009. On September 17, 2011, after years in the planning, the 30,000 square foot wave pool opened to the public, making Splash Lagoon the third largest indoor water park in the country. The same year, Tree Tops Indoor Rope Course opened where people can climb 30 feet above the area near Shark Attack and Python Plunge.

Attractions

Slides 
All of the water slides at Splash Lagoon were manufactured by ProSlide Technology

Other water attractions

Dry attractions 
All dry attractions at Splash Lagoon are open to the public. Water park admission is not required.

Retail and dining

Former attractions

References

External links
Splash Lagoon Website
Scott Enterprises Website

Water parks in Pennsylvania
Culture of Erie, Pennsylvania
Buildings and structures in Erie, Pennsylvania
Tourist attractions in Erie, Pennsylvania
2003 establishments in Pennsylvania
Resorts in Pennsylvania